Elnes may refer to:

 Elnes, Pas-de-Calais, Hauts-de-France, France
 
 Elnes Formation
 Elnes Station
 Electron energy loss spectroscopy